Orgeval is a commune in the Yvelines department in the Île-de-France region in north-central France. It shares its name with the small river that runs through it, a tributary of the Seine. 
Its inhabitants are called the Orgevalais.

Orgeval
Orgeval is served by 3 carriers and 9 lines.
The train station of St Quentin en Yvelines is the main station used by RER train lines 1 and 22 to travel to the city of Paris. 
Bus lines with day and night schedules are Line 20, Line 22, Line 50 terminating at Poissy, and Line 55. 
The Transdev Ile-de-France LINE 14 is also fully operational since upgrades completed to the Paris metro system.

History

Orgeval's location has been inhabited since the Prehistory, where tools made from flint dating from the Neolithic times were found.

It is said that a water source was used by the Gallo-Romans for its therapeutic virtues. This source was actually rediscovered in 1708 by the abbey's doctor, but its use was stopped in 1850.

Orgeval's first real mention in history came from the building of Abbaye Notre Dame d'Abbecourt in 1180 by Gasce of Poissy, suzerain of Orgeval. This abbey which descended from the Roman Catholic Diocese of Chartres was destroyed at the beginning of the 19th Century.

Nowadays, Orgeval possesses a church with a Romanesque architecture from the 11th century. The church is composed of a spire and an octagonal tower. The church nave dates back to the 16th century.

Population

Notable people linked to the commune

Georges Docquois (1863–1927) : novelist and poet, died there.
Catherine Rich (1932–2021): actress.
Claude Rich (1929–2017): actor.
Paul Strand (1890–1976) : important American photographer resided here with his third wife Hazel Kingsbury Strand from 1949 until his death in 1976.

See also
Communes of the Yvelines department

References

Communes of Yvelines